David Marquez may refer to:

David Márquez (born 1977), Spanish racewalker
David W. Márquez (born 1946), American politician
David Marquez (comics), comic book artist

See also
David Marques (1932–2010), English rugby union player
Marquez (disambiguation)